Gerald Kirk (14 July 1883 – 24 April 1915) was an English amateur football centre half who played in the Football League for Bradford City and Leeds City. He spent the majority of his career in non-league football for Ingleton, whom he captained.

Personal life 
Kirk attended Pocklington School and later married. On 1 September 1914, a month after Britain's entry into the First World War, Kirk enlisted as a private in the King's Own (Royal Lancaster Regiment). In October he was promoted to lance corporal and by 31 January 1915, he had been commissioned as a second lieutenant. In March 1915, Kirk's battalion was posted to the Western Front and entered the trenches near Bailleul. On 23 April 1915, he was shot through the chest while leading his platoon in an attack and died the following day at Number 3 Casualty Clearing Station, Poperinghe. Kirk was buried in Poperinghe Old Military Cemetery.

Career statistics

Honours 
Ingleton

 Lancaster & District League: 1902–03

References

External links
Player profile at BantamsPast.co.uk

1883 births
1915 deaths
English footballers
Bradford City A.F.C. players
British military personnel killed in World War I
King's Own Royal Regiment officers
British Army personnel of World War I
People educated at Pocklington School
Leeds City F.C. players
English Football League players
Association football wing halves
Footballers from Leeds